John Emanuel (born 5 April 1948), is a former Wales international footballer. A midfielder, he began his league career at Bristol City after being signed from Ferndale aged 23 years, he also spent time on loan at Swindon Town and Gillingham. He joined Newport County in 1976 and made 79 Football League appearances for Newport, scoring 4 goals. In 1978, he joined Barry Town.

Emanuel attained 2 caps for the Wales national football team.

References

External links
 

People from Treherbert
Sportspeople from Rhondda Cynon Taf
Welsh footballers
Wales international footballers
Bristol City F.C. players
Swindon Town F.C. players
Gillingham F.C. players
Newport County A.F.C. players
Barry Town United F.C. players
English Football League players
Living people
1948 births
Association football midfielders
Wales amateur international footballers